Jabez Curry Street (May 5, 1906 – November 7, 1989) was an American physicist, a co-discoverer of atomic particles called muons.

Street was also notable for heading the group at MIT that created ground and ship radar systems.  He also directed development of LORAN Navigation System, which is used worldwide for navigation purposes. Street was chairman of the physics department at Harvard University and acting director of the Cambridge Electron Accelerator, a member of the National Academy of Sciences.
The National Academies Press called him "a boldly innovative experimental physicist whose discoveries in cosmic rays influenced decisively the course of high-energy physics."

Chronology 

 May 5, 1906: born in Opelika, Alabama
 1927: B.S. in electrical engineering, the Alabama Polytechnic Institute (renamed in 1960 Auburn University)
 1931: Ph.D., the University of Virginia with thesis The fall of potential in electrical discharges under the supervision of Jesse Wakefield Beams
 1932–1970: Harvard University, Instructor to Professor of Physics
 1936: elected a Fellow of the American Physical Society
 1937: discovers muons with E. C. Stevenson at Harvard University
 1940–1945: MIT Radiation Laboratory, Researcher
 1953: elected to the National Academy of Sciences
 1955–1960: Harvard University, Chair, Department of Physics
 1962–1963: Harvard-MIT Cambridge Electron Accelerator, Acting Director
 1970–1976: Harvard University, Mallinckrodt Professor of Physics
 1976: retired
 1976–1989: Harvard University, Emeritus Mallinckrodt Professor of Physics
 November 7, 1989: died in Charleston, South Carolina

References 

1906 births
1989 deaths
People from Opelika, Alabama
University of Virginia alumni
Auburn University alumni
20th-century American physicists
Harvard University faculty
Massachusetts Institute of Technology faculty
Fellows of the American Physical Society
Members of the United States National Academy of Sciences